The Genuine Republican Party (PRG) was founded in Bolivia in 1921 by José María Escalier and Daniel Domingo Salamanca Urey following a split in the Republican Party.

Genuine Republican Party was formed by a conservative sector. The Republican Government of Bautista Saavedra enacted progressive social and labor codes and doubled government taxes on mining. Frightened, the urban upper class and traditional rural and regional elites rallied around Daniel Salamanca, a Cochabamba Department landowner and old-style patrician.
 
The program of this party advocated recovery of Bolivian territory and freedom of speech.

In May and December 1925 Daniel Domingo Salamanca Urey unsuccessfully ran in the presidential elections. 

Shaken by his defeats, Daniel Salamanca retired from politics and dedicated himself to teaching law. After the military overthrow of Hernando Siles Reyes in 1930, Daniel Salamanca was asked to head a coalition of Genuine Republicans and Liberals. He was elected president and took office on 5 March 1931.

The Government of Salamanca introduced an unpopular austerity program and clamped down on political opposition to his government. He also revived hostilities with Paraguay in the disputed Chaco region. The escalation of the war exacerbated severe economic problems in Bolivia, while causing many thousands of casualties. On 27 November 1934, the Bolivian military deposed Daniel Salamanca.

In 1940 the party formed The Concordance with Liberals to counter the rising tide of radical and revolutionary parties; the Concordance supported the candidate Enrique Peñaranda.

On 10 November 1946, the Genuine Republican Party merged with the Republican Socialist Party, the United Socialist Party and Independent Socialist Party to form the new Republican Socialist Unity Party.

Notes

Defunct political parties in Bolivia
Political parties established in 1921
Right-wing parties in South America
Political parties disestablished in 1946